Asha Kelunni  better known by her stage name Revathi, is an Indian actress and director, known for her works predominantly in Tamil cinema- in addition to Malayalam, Telugu, Hindi & Kannada films. She has won several accolades, including the  National Film Awards in three different categories, and six Filmfare Awards South. She was one of the  most successful leading actresses of South Indian cinema.

Filmography

As an actress

Tamil

Malayalam

Telugu

Hindi

Kannada

As director

As voice actor

As playback singer

Television

See also
 List of Indian film actresses

References

External links
 Official website
 

Indian filmographies
Actress filmographies